Wilber L. Paulson (July 2, 1896 – January 24, 1954) was an American businessman and politician.

Paulsom was born in Minneapolis, Minnesota and went to the Minneapolis Public Schools. He served in the United States Army during World War I. Paulson went to the Minneapolis College of Law and was involved with the insurance business. Paulson served in the Minnesota House of Representatives in 1925 and 1926.

References

1896 births
1954 deaths
Businesspeople from Minneapolis
Politicians from Minneapolis
Military personnel from Minneapolis
William Mitchell College of Law alumni
Members of the Minnesota House of Representatives